Barry Bogin (born May 20, 1950) is an American physical anthropologist trained at Temple University who researches physical growth in Guatemalan Maya children, and is a theorist upon the evolutionary origins of human childhood. He is a professor at Loughborough University in the UK, after professorships at the University of Michigan-Dearborn, and Wayne State University. During 1974–1976, he was a visiting professor at the Universidad del Valle de Guatemala.

Books

 The Family as an Environment for Human Development, edited with N. Wolanski (1996, Kamal Raj Publishers)  
 Human Biology: An Evolutionary and Biocultural Approach, edited with S. Stinson, R. Huss-Ashmore, & D. O'Rourke (2000, Wiley)  
 The Growth of Humanity (2001, Wiley) 
 Methods in Human Growth Research (2005)

References

External links
 Barry’s home page

1950 births
Living people
Academics of Loughborough University
American anthropologists
Psychological anthropologists
Temple University alumni
University of Michigan–Dearborn people
Wayne State University faculty
Auxologists